Oropetium is a genus of Asian and African plants in the grass family.

 Species
 Oropetium aristatum (Stapf) Pilg. - tropical West Africa
 Oropetium capense Stapf  - Arabian Peninsula, desert and near-desert regions of Africa
 Oropetium minimum (Hochst.) Pilg.  - Arabian Peninsula, eastern + northeastern Africa
 Oropetium roxburghianum (Schult.) S.M.Phillips - India
 Oropetium thomaeum (L.f.) Trin. - eastern + northeastern Africa, Indian Subcontinent, Myanmar, Vietnam
 Oropetium villosulum Stapf ex Bor - India

 Formerly included
see Tripogon 
 Oropetium africanum - Tripogon africanus

References

External links
 Grassbase - The World Online Grass Flora

Chloridoideae
Poaceae genera